Bryagovo (Bulgarian Брягово) is a village in Parvomay Municipality, Plovdiv Province, Bulgaria.
It is to the south of Parvomay town and to the north of Bryagovo Reservoir and the village of Iskra.

References
Guide Bulgaria Bryagovo 

Villages in Plovdiv Province
Romani communities in Bulgaria